Hapry is a hamlet in Myasnikovsky District of Rostov Oblast, Russia.

Geography 
Located in the center of the district, 2 km south-west of the regional center of Chaltyr, on the right bank of the Dead Donets river, 23 m above sea level.

On the southern outskirts of the farm passes the railway line Rostov-Main - Taganrog-II, in the same place the nearest station is the Safyanovo platform.

Neighboring settlements: Nedvigovka farm 4 km to the west and Wet Chaltyr 1 km to the east.

History 
In 1929, Kh. Kalinin was included in the Myasnikovsky District, and then, in 1933, the Khapersky Village Council was joined with the Nedvigovka, Khapry and M. Chaltyr farms.

Rural localities in Rostov Oblast